Villa Pauli is a villa and club located at Strandvägen 19 in the suburb of Djursholm and county of Stockholm, Sweden.

He made a fortune in Latin America in the 1850s, co-founded the Enskilda Bank and founded Handelsbanken. He then funded Alfred Nobel’s Nitroglycerine Corporation and became its Chairman 1864-1904. Together with his young relative Ragnar Sohlman, he became instrumental in establishing the Nobel Foundation and the Nobel Prize based on Alfred’s testament. He also financed the establishment of the University of Stockholm. 

The villa, designed by famous architect Ragnar Östberg, was richly decorated with works by the painter Georg Pauli and sculptor Carl Eldh. It remained a private residence until 1968, when it was acquired by the Catholic Church for the purpose of visiting cardinals and was used as a convent. Pope John Paul II has stayed there.

In 1985 the villa was acquired by the real estate magnate Birger Gustavsson, who converted into a club for corporate members that opened September 1986.  bought the club in 1998 and upgraded and redecorated it, including interior decoration featuring antiques, original art and sculptures. Many companies use the Villa Pauli Club as a venue for an event, fashion show or product launch.

External links 

 Villa Pauli

Houses completed in 1907
Buildings and structures in Stockholm County